Shalango is a historic plantation house located at Wicomico Church, Northumberland County, Virginia.  It was built in 1855–1856, and is a large -story, five bay, I-house frame dwelling.  It has a single-pile, central-passage plan and interior end chimneys. The house stands on a tall brick basement and is covered with a gable roof pierced by three dormers on either slope.  The front facade features a one-story late 19th-century porch with scroll-sawn decoration.

It was listed on the National Register of Historic Places in 1986.

References

Plantation houses in Virginia
Houses on the National Register of Historic Places in Virginia
Houses completed in 1856
Houses in Northumberland County, Virginia
National Register of Historic Places in Northumberland County, Virginia
I-houses in Virginia